Brush Harbor is an unincorporated community in Montgomery County, Virginia, United States.

The Nealy Gordon Farm was listed on the National Register of Historic Places in 1989.

References

Unincorporated communities in Montgomery County, Virginia
Unincorporated communities in Virginia